Animere (sometimes Anyimere or Kunda, the latter being a toponym) is a language spoken in Ghana, in the Kecheibe and Kunda villages of the Benimbere people. It is most closely related to Kebu or Akebu of Togo. Both are Ghana Togo Mountain languages (GTM), classified as members of the Ka-Togo group by Heine (1968). Like most other GTM languages, Animere is a noun-class language.

Animere is an endangered language which is no longer being passed on to children; the speaker count is approximately 30 (Blench 2006). Already in 1965 Adele, another GTM language, was the dominant language among the younger generation in the Animere area, and only elderly people spoke Animere among themselves, leading Heine (1968) to expect that 'the language is going to be extinct in a few decades'. Knowledge of Twi, a dominant regional language, is also widespread among the Benimbere.

Footnotes

References
 Bodomo, Adams B. (1996) 'On Language And Development In Africa: The Case of Ghana', Nordic Journal of African Studies, 5, 2, 31–51.
 Heine, Bernd (1968) Die Verbreitung und Gliedering der Togorestsprachen (Kölner Beiträge zur Afrikanistik vol. 1). Köln: Druckerei Wienand.
 Seidel, A., (1898) "Beiträge zur Kenntnis der Sprachen in Togo." Aufgrund der von Dr. Rudolf Plehn und anderen gesammelten Materialien bearbeitet. Zeitschrift für Afrikanischer und Oceanischer Sprachen.
 Sommer, Gabriele (1992) 'A survey on language death in Africa', in Brenzinger, Matthias (ed.) Language Death: Factual and Theoretical Explorations with Special Reference to East Africa. Berlin/New York: Mouton de Gruyter, pp. 301–417.

External links
Animere profile on UNESCO-CI
ELAR archive of Documention of Animere, Ghana (Kwa, Niger-Congo): A Pilot Study

Languages of Ghana
Ghana–Togo Mountain languages
Endangered languages of Africa